Ioannis  "Yanis" Varoufakis (born 24 March 1961) is a Greek economist and politician. A former academic, he served as the Greek Minister of Finance from January to July 2015 under Prime Minister Alexis Tsipras. He has been Secretary-General of MeRA25, a left-wing political party, since he founded it in 2018. A former member of Syriza, Varoufakis was a member of the Hellenic Parliament for Athens B from January to September 2015; he regained a parliamentary seat in July 2019.

Varoufakis was born in Athens in 1961. He studied mathematics and economics at the University of Birmingham and the University of Essex, where he obtained a PhD in economics. He then taught economics in the United Kingdom and then at the University of Sydney, before returning to Greece in 2000 to teach at the University of Athens.

In January 2015, Varoufakis was appointed Greek Minister of Finance. He led negotiations with Greece's creditors during the government-debt crisis. However, he failed to reach an agreement with the European troika (European Commission, European Central Bank, and International Monetary Fund) leading to the 2015 bailout referendum. The referendum rejected the troika bailout terms, and the day afterwards Varoufakis resigned as Minister of Finance, being replaced by Euclid Tsakalotos. On 24 August, Varoufakis voted against the third bailout package; in the ensuing September snap election, he did not stand for reelection. Varoufakis has since appeared in numerous debates, lectures and interviews. In February 2016, he launched the Democracy in Europe Movement 2025 (DiEM25) and subsequently backed a Remain vote in the 2016 United Kingdom European Union membership referendum. In March 2018, he founded MeRA25, the "electoral wing" of DiEM25 in Greece. In the 2019 legislative election, MeRA25 was the sixth most voted-for party, amassing nine parliamentary seats, with Varoufakis himself returning to the Hellenic Parliament.

Early life and education
Varoufakis was born in Palaio Faliro, Athens, on 24 March 1961, to Georgios and Eleni Varoufakis.

Varoufakis's father, Georgios Varoufakis, was an Egyptiote Greek (but ultimately originating from Rethymno in Crete) who emigrated from Cairo to Greece in the 1940s, arriving in the midst of the Greek Civil War. One day, he was "roughed up" by the police and asked to sign a denunciation of communism. In response, he said: "Look I am not a Buddhist, but I would never sign a denunciation of Buddhism". He therefore ended up spending several years imprisoned on the island of Makronisos, which was used for the political re-education of people who fought on the communist side in the war. After being released in 1950, he completed his university studies and found employment as the personal assistant to the owner of Halyvourgiki; Greece's biggest steel producer. In 2003, he was appointed chairman of the board of directors of "Halyvourgiki"; a position he held until the company closed in January 2020. He died in September 2021.

Varoufakis's mother, a student at the University of Athens School of Chemistry at the time she met Georgios, abandoned her conservative background after meeting her husband who was, at the time, allied to United Democratic Left (EDA). In the mid-1970s Eleni Varoufaki became an activist for the Women's Union of Greece, which promoted gender equality and had been set up by members of PASOK. By the early-1980s, the couple had converged politically to the same political centre-left views and engaged with the socialist PASOK. Eleni was elected Deputy Mayor of Palaio Faliro a few years before she died in 2008.

Varoufakis was six years old when the military coup d'état of April 1967 took place. Varoufakis later said that the military junta showed him a "sense of what it means to be both unfree and, at once, convinced that the possibilities for progress and improvement are endless". The junta collapsed when Varoufakis was in junior high school. Attending the private Moraitis School, Varoufakis decided early to spell his first name with one 'n', rather than the standard two, for "aesthetic" reasons. When his teacher gave him a low mark for that, he became angry and has continued spelling his first name with one 'n' ever since.

Varoufakis finished his secondary education around 1976, when his parents deemed it too dangerous for him to continue his education in Greece. Therefore, he moved to the United Kingdom in 1978 where he entered the University of Essex. His "initial urge was to study physics" but he decided that "the lingua franca of political discourse was economics". He therefore enrolled in the economics course at Essex, but it has also been suggested that he decided to enroll in economics after meeting Andreas Papandreou. After only a few weeks of lectures, Varoufakis switched his degree to mathematics. Whilst at the University of Essex he joined a variety of political organisations including ComSoc (the University Communist Society) and the Troops Out Movement, which campaigned for a British withdrawal from Northern Ireland. He also became involved with the African National Congress, Palestine Liberation Organization, and other organisations such as those in solidarity with Chile. Varoufakis was also elected as secretary of the Black Students Alliance, a choice that caused some controversy, given that he is not black, to which he responded by telling them, according to his PhD supervisor Monojit Chatterjee, "that black was a political term and, as a Greek, on the grounds of ethnicity he had as much reason to be there as anyone else." Varoufakis also took part in student debates, where one of his rivals was John Bercow, who later became the Speaker of the House of Commons.

He moved to the University of Birmingham in October 1981, obtaining an MSc in mathematical statistics in October 1982. He completed his PhD in economics in 1987 writing a thesis on Optimization and Strikes, back at the University of Essex, where his PhD supervisor was Monojit Chatterji.

Academic career

Between 1982 and 1988, Varoufakis taught economics and econometrics at the University of Essex and the University of East Anglia, and also taught at the University of Cambridge. He did not wish to return to Greece for fear of conscription, and so accepted an offer to lecture at the University of Sydney, where he remained until 2000. From 1989 to 2000, he taught as senior lecturer in economics at the Department of Economics of the University of Sydney, with short stints at the University of Glasgow and the University of Louvain (UCLouvain). Varoufakis, during his time in Sydney, had his own slot on a local television show where he was critical of John Howard's conservative government. He also acquired Australian citizenship.

In 2000, a combination of "nostalgia and abhorrence of the conservative turn of the land Down Under", led Varoufakis to return to Greece where he was unanimously elected an associate professor of economic theory at the University of Athens. In 2002, Varoufakis established The University of Athens Doctoral Program in Economics (UADPhilEcon), which he directed until 2008. In 2005 he was promoted to full professor of economic theory.

From January 2004 to December 2006, Varoufakis served as economic advisor to George Papandreou, of whose government he was to become an ardent critic a few years later.

Beginning in March 2012, Varoufakis became economist-in-residence at video game publisher, Valve. He researched exchange rates within the virtual economy on the Steam digital delivery platform, specifically looking at exchange rates and trade deficits. In June 2012, he began a blog about his research at Valve. In February 2013 his function at Valve was to work on a game for predicting trends in gaming. From January 2013 he taught at the Lyndon B. Johnson School of Public Affairs at the University of Texas at Austin as a visiting professor. In November 2013, he was appointed guest professor at Stockholm University, Department of Computer and Systems Sciences, to work within game and decision theory at the department's centre eGovLab. In 2013, he was appointed the Athens desk editor of the online magazine WDW Review, in which he contributed until January 2015.

Minister of Finance and the Syriza government (January–August 2015)

Varoufakis was elected to the Greek parliament, representing Syriza, and took office in the new government of Alexis Tsipras two days later, on 27 January 2015. He was appointed Finance Minister by Tsipras shortly after the election victory. The party promised to renegotiate Greece's debt and significantly curtail the austerity measures which had led to the longest recession in post-war global history.

The new government had to negotiate an extension on its loan agreement, due to expire on 28 February 2015. On 4 February 2015, the ECB lifted the waiver affecting marketable debt instruments issued or fully guaranteed by Greece that until then allowed Greek banks to benefit from cheap liquidity. As a result of this decision, Greek banks, already strained by the run on deposits, had to depend on Emergency Liquidity Assistance (ELA), which is, however, significantly more expensive than regular ECB financing. When the ECB raised the provision of ELA very modestly by 3.3 billion euro on 18 February 2015 (when outflows of deposits from Greek banks were reaching record heights), everybody knew that this was an ultimatum: either Greece should strike an agreement within days or it would have to face very serious bank problems. As in the cases of Ireland and Cyprus crises, the ELA was again used as pressure to bring about a quick agreement.Had the EU loan agreement expired without renewal, the European Central Bank would have pulled its liquidity provisions from Greece's commercial banks, ensuring that they closed their doors to the public. Varoufakis led this negotiation at the Eurogroup and with the International Monetary Fund. On 20 February, at the Eurogroup, an agreement to extend the Greek loan "facility" for four months, until 30 June 2015, was struck and Varoufakis hailed it as crucial – because it represented a fresh start by specifying that the terms of the loan would be renegotiated and its conditions would be re-drawn on the basis of a new list of reforms to be provided by the Greek government. That list was submitted by Varoufakis on 23 February and was approved by the Eurogroup on 24 February. On those grounds, Varoufakis signed the official document by which the loan agreement's expiry date was to be extended from 28 February to 30 June 2015 – a four-month period during which a new agreement was to be negotiated.

This extension was formalized by the third amendment of the Master Financial Assistance Facility Agreement (MFFA), initially concluded between Greece and EFSF on 15 March 2012. The amendment is clear on two things. It changed the expiry date and also required that the €10.9 billion held by the Hellenic Financial Stability Fund (HFSF) to cover potential bank recapitalisation and resolution costs were returned to the EFSF. This sum can now be released to Greece only on request by the ECB (in its capacity as bank supervisor). This means that the first declared goal of the Greek government, i.e. to enter a totally new arrangement and replace the financial-assistance procedures by a “non-technocratic”, political negotiation at high level, was not achieved. The new agreement was an extension of the old one and was governed by the same basic rules and principles. The same happened in the case of the second goal, i.e. to activate a procedure that would lead to some form of debt relief. According to the Eurogroup statement, the Greek authorities reiterated “their unequivocal commitment to honour their financial obligations to all their creditors fully and timely.” At least in the short term, Greek plans for some form of debt redemption, thus, had to be shelved.

Greece, however, won flexibility regarding the 2015 primary surplus target. This would be modified downwards from its previously agreed level to “take the economic circumstances in 2015 into account.” Regarding old measures, the Greek Government had to revise its promise to cancel many of the austerity measures it heavily criticized since 2010 as an opposition party, agreeing to “refrain from any rollback of measures and unilateral changes to the policies and structural reforms that would negatively impact fiscal targets, economic recovery or financial stability, as assessed by the institutions.” In this context, “economic recovery” is broad enough to cover any type of measure agreed upon since 2010. Finally, the agreement endorses the intention of the Greek government to give priority to rule-of-law and state-building reforms by “implementing long overdue reforms to tackle corruption and tax evasion, and improving the efficiency of the public sector.”

Varoufakis's view on Greece's public debt, and the 2010 crisis which began as a result of the Greek government's inability to fund it, was that EU bailouts were attempts to take on the largest loan in history on condition of austerity measures that would shrink the incomes from which old, un-serviceable loans and new bailout debts would have to be repaid. Varoufakis argued that the "bailout" loans of 2010 and 2012, before restructuring the debt properly and putting in place a developmental program (including reforming the oligarchy, creating a development bank and dealing with the banks' non-performing loans) would lead to deeper bankruptcy, a great depression and a harder default in the future. His explanation of why the troika of Greece's lenders (the IMF, the ECB, and the European Commission) insisted on these bailout loans was that they represented a transfer of losses from the private banks to Greece's and Europe's taxpayers. In his view, the 20 February 2015 Eurogroup agreement that he negotiated, "was an excellent opportunity to move forward." However, this view was not shared by the Eurozone countries or the wider financial community. The ECB had prevented the Greek Government from raising money cheaply and had also forced Greek banks to rely on expensive ELA funding. In other words, the Eurozone had signalled that 'strict conditionality' would apply and that Greece would face a Banking collapse if it did not comply.

Thus, the troika of lenders did not agree to let the new Greek government change the previous terms of the agreement or to a debt restructuring. Varoufakis claims that, soon after the extension was granted at the end of February, the troika reneged on its alleged promise to consider a new fiscal and reform program for Greece, demanding of the Greek government that it implement the old one (which the Syriza government was elected to re-write). In March 2015, the Wall Street Journal pointed to several tensions between Greece and the other Eurozone countries, saying that some countries feel they have taken the "tough medicine" and the €195 billion owed is not insignificant. Further, they stated other governments have philosophical differences with Varoufakis and his Anglosphere and Keynesian leanings. Peter Ludlow said Varoufakis and his colleagues "turned instinctively ... to the U.K. and the U.S. even before they called on the European Left."

In a discussion with Nobel laureate Joseph Stiglitz on invitation of U.S. economic think tank Institute for New Economic Thinking, Varoufakis stated on 9 April 2015 that "the Greek state does not have the capacity to develop public assets." Therefore, he announced that his government was "restarting the privatization process." However, unlike the former governments they would insist on establishing public–private partnerships with the state retaining a minority stake to generate state revenues. They would also require a minimum investment on behalf of the bidder, and "decent working conditions" for workers. Varoufakis also said that although the government needed to avoid a primary budget deficit, the bailout program's target of a surplus of 4.5 percent of GDP was outlandish and should be reduced to no more than 1.5 percent.

After many weeks of negotiations during which the Greek government, often against Varoufakis's advice, made many concessions to the troika of Greece's lenders, no agreement was in sight. One reason was that the members of the troika did not have a unified position. For example, the IMF insisted that the Greek government's demand for a public debt restructure should be granted so that their own money could be returned to them while the other creditors ate the loss, while powerful finance ministers in the Eurogroup (Germany's, for instance) refused this because they did not want to eat the loss. Another alleged reason was that, with elections approaching in Spain, Ireland, and Portugal, various politicians within the EU did not want to see Greece's radical new government emerge as successful though, of course, if Greece had succeeded in paying them back their money they would have been delighted. Moreover, the differences in economic ideology- in particular the ideological opposition to losing money- will have contributed to the lack of progress towards a mutually-agreeable solution.

On 25 June 2015, Varoufakis was presented with an ultimatum in the Eurogroup. It included a fiscal proposal, a reform agenda, and a funding formula that Varoufakis, his government, and several other ministers of finance sitting in the Eurogroup, considered to be non-viable. The next day, the Greek Prime Minister, Alexis Tsipras, called for a referendum on the Eurogroup's proposal on 5 July.
On 27 July, in Brussels, Varoufakis asked for a one month extension. He said, according to his own tape recording of the meeting, 'The question is very simple, there is a proposal by the institutions (i.e. the Troika). The institutions worked very hard to come up with it. We could not bring ourselves to signing it for reasons I have explained, it is up to the Greek people to decide. The suggestion that we’re coming to you with is that a one-month extension is offered of the existing arrangement so as to allow a smooth transition from today to the 6th of July so as to allow the Greek people, in calmness to deliberate, to consider the proposal which is in front of them, and to make a considered judgment on that basis.'
The Irish Finance Minister responded by pointing out that a run of the Greek banks and ATMs had begun. The German representative confirmed that there would be no extension. Greece would face a Banking crisis. It was left to Luis de Guindos to turn down Varoufakis's plea for an extension by pointing out that calling a referendum was scarcely a confidence building measure precisely because the gap between the Greek and the Troika's position was bridgeable. This showed there was no 'contagion risk'. Greece was welcome to destroy itself, nobody else would be affected. Mario Draghi and Christine Lagard, on behalf of the ECB and the IMF respectively, confirmed that Greece was on its own though any other affected party could get help. In other words, Greece, simply by calling the referendum, had lost Institutional support; it was on its own.

On 5 July 2015, the bailout referendum took place. Varoufakis had campaigned vigorously in favour of the 'No' vote, against the united support for the 'Yes' of Greece's media. To make his position clear, he declared on television that he would resign as finance minister if Greeks voted 'Yes'. The outcome of the vote was a resounding 61.5 percent vote in favour of 'No'. Varoufakis went on television, soon after the result was announced, and declared that the government was determined to honour this new mandate for a different agreement with its creditors. However, a few hours later, Varoufakis resigned. In his resignation statement the following morning he claimed that "other European participants" had expressed a wish for his absence. Later he explained that he decided to resign during a meeting with the prime minister, on the night of the referendum, during which he discovered that the prime minister, instead of being energised by the "No" vote, declared to Varoufakis his decision to acquiesce to the troika's terms. Unwilling to sign such a "surrender" document, Varoufakis chose to resign.

His explanation, published later by Harry Lambert, New Statesman, 13 July 2015, was this: "I'm not going to betray my own view, that I honed back in 2010, that this country must stop extending and pretending, we must stop taking on new loans pretending that we've solved the problem, when we haven't; when we have made our debt even less sustainable on condition of further austerity that even further shrinks the economy; and shifts the burden further onto the have nots, creating a humanitarian crisis. It's something I'm not going to accept, I'm not going to be party to."

In a 16 July teleconference with private investors that was later made public, Varoufakis described a five-month clandestine project he ran as finance minister involving hacking into Greece's independent tax service's computers. The project's goal was to develop a parallel payment system that could be implemented as a contingency plan if the Greek system failed, and was dubbed "Plan B". In it, individuals' private identification numbers were accessed and copied to a computer controlled by a "childhood friend" of Varoufakis.

On Friday 14 August, the government (without Varoufakis) pushed successfully through parliament the third Greek bailout agreement. The bailout bill received 222 votes to 64 (as the opposition voted in favour). Up to 40 Syriza members including Varoufakis voted against the bailout. Just prior to that vote, Varoufakis rose in parliament to offer the Prime Minister of Greece his resignation from his parliamentary seat, saying that this was the only way he knew how to combine his strong opposition to the new bailout with loyalty to the party and the prime minister. On 20 August, the prime minister himself resigned and called a snap election due to the loss of support from rebelling Syriza MPs. Varoufakis had already declared that he was not interested in standing again for Syriza. At the same time, Syriza announced that any MP who voted against the bailout package would not be standing for the party. Varoufakis did not go on to represent Popular Unity, unlike many of his ex-Syriza colleagues, as he considered the party too isolationist. Varoufakis chose not to stand in the election, saying he would focus on creating a European network that would 'restor[e] democracy' in Europe. A month later, the national election was held and despite a low voter turnout, Tsipras and his Syriza Party won just over 35 percent of the vote. Combining with the Independent Greeks Party, a majority was achieved and Tsipras was returned to power.

Commentary on appointment
The Adam Smith Institute, a leading free-market think tank in the United Kingdom, "enthusiastically" supported Varoufakis's debt-swap plan and asked the then British Chancellor of the Exchequer George Osborne to support it. Varoufakis had proposed debt swap measures, including bonds pegged to economic growth, which would replace the existing bonds of the European bailout programme.

Bloomberg said that Varoufakis was a "brilliant economist", but he had difficult interactions with other politicians and the media. Galbraith, referring to Varoufakis's expertise in game theory, has said that he knows as much about this subject "as anyone on the planet", and that "[he] will be thinking more than a few steps ahead" in any interactions with the troika. Two weeks later, Varoufakis wrote an op-ed in The New York Times saying that using game theory would be "pure folly" and that he wanted to "shun any temptation to treat this pivotal moment as an experiment in strategizing and, instead, to present honestly the facts concerning Greece's social economy".

Later political career (2015–present) 
In September 2015, Varoufakis appeared on the British topical debate show, Question Time, and was praised for his performance by Mark Lawson in The Guardian, who wrote: "several of the sentences he spoke in a second language were more impressive than most that his fellow panellists managed in their native tongue." He appeared on the show again in October 2016 and March 2019. He has described himself as a "libertarian Marxist".

Varoufakis attended an event in London hosted by The Guardian on 23 October 2015, where he spoke about the UK's upcoming European Union membership referendum. He said that the UK should remain in the EU, but also campaign to democratise it: "My message is simple yet rich: those of us who disdain the democratic deficit in Brussels, those of us who detest the authoritarianism of a technocracy which is incompetent and contemptuous of democracy, those of us who are most critical of Europe have a moral duty to stay in Europe, fight for it, and democratise it." He would return to the UK, in May 2016, in the final stages of the campaigning to again urge a remain vote.
On 9 February 2016, Varoufakis launched the Democracy in Europe Movement 2025 (DiEM25) at the Volksbühne in Berlin.

In March 2016, Varoufakis publicly supported the idea of a basic income. On 2 April 2016, in reaction to tension between German Chancellor Angela Merkel and the IMF, Varoufakis said there was underway "an attrition war between a reasonably numerate villain (the IMF) and a chronic procrastinator (Berlin)" as to Greek debt relief.

In March 2018, Varoufakis announced the launch of his own political party, MeRA 25, with a stated aim of freeing Greece from "debt bondage". He stated that he hoped the party would be based on an alliance of "people of the left and liberalism, greens and feminists". The party, whose name stands for "European Realistic Disobedience Front", is affiliated to DiEM25.

On 25 November 2018, Varoufakis was selected to head the list of Democracy in Motion (the German section of DiEM25) for the 2019 European elections but was not elected, as DiEM25 lists failed to elect a single MEP.

On Friday, March 10, 2023, Varoufakis was dining with DiEM25 associates in central Athens when a group of masked thugs entered the restaurant, approached him and falsely accused him of siding with the troika, selling out on austerity bailouts. When he took the confrontation outside, they beat him violently, in what DiEM25 described as a “brazen fascist attack”. At least one person, a teenager, was charged in the attack. Despite his broken nose and other injuries, Varoufakis remained steadfast in his commitment to focus on the fatal Tempi train crash a few weeks earlier. Varoufakis decided to accept police protection by the Citizen Protection Ministry.

Progressive International 
On 20 August 2018, in an on-stage book festival interview in Edinburgh, Varoufakis pressed Jeremy Corbyn, head of the British Labour Party, to "be a bit more ambitious" and become involved in the international progressive movement, saying "We need a progressive international". On 13 September, Varoufakis penned an op-ed piece in The Guardian about the need for an international progressive movement, alongside a similar piece by fellow progressive U.S. Senator Bernie Sanders. On 26 October in Rome, Varoufakis announced the Progressive International, which was described as a "common blueprint for an International New Deal, a progressive New Bretton Woods". The organization officially launched on 30 November in Sanders' home town of Burlington, Vermont.

Re-election 
On 7 July 2019, his party MeRA25 passed the threshold necessary to enter the Greek parliament and Varoufakis was re-elected an MP.

In November 2019, along with other public figures, Varoufakis signed a letter supporting Labour Party leader Jeremy Corbyn describing him as "a beacon of hope in the struggle against emergent far-right nationalism, xenophobia and racism in much of the democratic world" and endorsed him in the 2019 UK general election. In December 2019, along with 42 other leading cultural figures, he signed a letter endorsing the Labour Party under Corbyn's leadership in the 2019 general election. The letter stated that "Labour's election manifesto under Jeremy Corbyn's leadership offers a transformative plan that prioritises the needs of people and the planet over private profit and the vested interests of a few."

Works
Varoufakis is the author of several books on the European debt crisis, the financial imbalance in the world and game theory. He is also a recognised speaker and often appears as an analyst for national news media.

A film based on his book Adults in the Room directed by Costa-Gavras was released in 2019. Varoufakis himself is portrayed by actor Christos Loulis.

A Modest Proposal
In November 2010, he and Stuart Holland, a former British Labour Party MP and economics professor at the University of Coimbra (Portugal), published A Modest Proposal, a set of economic policies aimed at overcoming the euro crisis.

In 2013, Version 4.0 of A Modest Proposal appeared with the American economist James K. Galbraith as a third co-author. This version was published in late 2013 in French with a supporting foreword by Michel Rocard, former Prime Minister of France. , Truman Factor features select articles by Varoufakis in English and in Spanish.

The Global Minotaur

First published in 2011, The Global Minotaur constructs a historical narrative and metaphor which Varoufakis uses to describe the world economy from the mid-1970s to the 2008 crash and beyond. He argues that the global economy since the 1970s can be viewed as being built around the financing of the twin deficits of the United States – its trade deficit and government deficit. Varoufakis argues that the United States powered the global economy by consuming the exports of the rest of the world, and then the surpluses flowed back to the United States by going to institutions on Wall Street or being used to buy U.S. Treasury debt. He suggests the recycling back to the U.S. happened naturally due to the status of the dollar as the global reserve currency, and because of the profitability of U.S. corporations and returns on Wall Street. However, when the U.S. economy and banking system faltered in 2008, the United States' ability to consume vast quantities of imports decreased, and investing in Wall Street became a much less inviting prospect, so the system seized up. This explains why the 2008 recession was felt so heavily around the world. The metaphor of the Minotaur is used as Varoufakis characterizes the flows back to the U.S. as a "tribute" to a great power.

Books in English
 (ed.): Conflict in Economics. Hemel Hempstead: Harvester Wheatsheaf and New York: St Martin's Press, 1990 (with David P. T. Young)
 Rational Conflict. Oxford: Blackwell, 1991
 Game Theory: A critical introduction. London and New York: Routledge, 1995 (with Shaun Hargreaves-Heap), . 2nd rev ed, 2004 (Game Theory: A critical text),  (translated also in Japanese)
 Foundations of Economics: A beginner's companion. London and New York: Routledge, 1998 (translation in Mandarin)
 (ed.): Game Theory: Critical Perspectives. Volumes 1–5, London and New York: Routledge, 2001
 Modern Political Economics: Making sense of the post-2008 world. London and New York: Routledge, 2011 (with Joseph Halevi and Nicholas Theocarakis)
 Economic Indeterminacy: A personal encounter with the economists' most peculiar nemesis. London and New York: Routledge, 2013
 Europe after the Minotaur: Greece and the Future of the Global Economy. London and New York: Zed Books, 2015
 The Global Minotaur: America, the True Origins of the Financial Crisis and the Future of the World Economy. London and New York: Zed Books, 2011 (translations in German, Greek, Italian, Spanish, Czech, Finnish, French, Norwegian, and Polish); 2nd ed, 2013; 3rd ed, 2015
 And the Weak Suffer What They Must? Europe's crisis, America's economic future. New York: Nation Books, 2016 (U.S. edition); And The Weak Suffer What They Must?: Europe, Austerity and the Threat to Global Stability. London: The Bodley Head, 2016 (UK edition) 
 Adults in the Room: My Battle With Europe's Deep Establishment. London and New York: Random House, 2017 The Guardian ranked Adults in the Room #86 in its list of 100 Best Books of the 21st Century.
 Talking to My Daughter About the Economy. The Bodley Head Ltd, 2017
 Another Now: Dispatches from an Alternative Present, Bodley Head, 2020

Essays

Personal life
Varoufakis is married to installation artist Danae Stratou.

See also
Miranda Xafa

References

External links

  
 Personal blog at Valve, analysis of digital economies 
 Personal commentary published at Project Syndicate, analysis of Greece and Europe 
 "Crush the Greeks!" by Yanis Varoufakis, published at Truman Factor on 17 November 2014
 

|-

1961 births
20th-century atheists
21st-century atheists
20th-century Greek economists
21st-century Greek economists
Academics of the University of East Anglia
Alumni of the University of Birmingham
Alumni of the University of Essex
Australian economists
Australian Marxists
Australian socialists
Fellows of Trinity College, Cambridge
Finance ministers of Greece
Greek atheists
Greek emigrants to Australia
Greek expatriates in England
Greek expatriates in the United States
Greek government-debt crisis
Greek MPs 2015 (February–August)
Libertarian Marxists
Libertarian socialists
Living people
Marxian economists
Marxist theorists
Greek Marxist writers
Academic staff of the National and Kapodistrian University of Athens
Naturalised citizens of Australia
People in the video game industry
Valve Corporation people
Politicians from Athens
Greek MPs 2019–2023
Greek political party founders